Kevin Ryan is an American Democratic Party politician currently serving as a member of the Connecticut House of Representatives from the 139th district, which includes the town of Bozrah as well as parts of Montville and Norwich since 1993. Ryan was first elected in 1992 and has been re-elected every year since, making him the second longest-serving state lawmaker. Ryan was most recently elected in 2020 after defeating Republican Caleb Espinosa by nearly 1000 votes. Ryan currently serves on the House Appropriations Committee, Public Health Committee, and Environment Committee.

References 

Living people
Year of birth missing (living people)
Democratic Party members of the Connecticut House of Representatives
People from Montville, Connecticut
21st-century American politicians